Danielle Santos Atkinson (born April 9, 1984) is an American basketball coach who is currently the head women's basketball coach at Hofstra University, a role she has held since 2019.

Career statistics 

Source:

Head coaching record

References

External links 
 
 
 Hofstra Pride profile
 Florida Gators profile

1984 births
Living people
Sportspeople from Marietta, Georgia
Basketball players from Atlanta
Basketball players from Marietta, Georgia
Basketball coaches from Georgia (U.S. state)
Shooting guards
Florida Gators women's basketball players
Hofstra Pride women's basketball coaches
Illinois State Redbirds women's basketball coaches
Kentucky Wildcats women's basketball coaches
Florida State Seminoles women's basketball coaches
Pittsburgh Panthers women's basketball coaches